North Square is a British television drama series written and created by Peter Moffat, and broadcast by Channel 4 from 18 October to 20 December 2000. Starring an ensemble cast, including Phil Davis, Rupert Penry-Jones, Helen McCrory and Kevin McKidd, the programme is set around the practice of a barristers' chambers in Leeds. The series was filmed in and around the real life Park Square, Leeds. This is the area in the city where the majority of barristers' chambers are concentrated.

Despite gaining considerable critical acclaim, the show failed to garner a substantial audience resulting in only the one series of ten episodes being produced. In Australia, the series was broadcast in 2001 on ABC and repeated in 2004 after popular and critical acclaim. The full series was released on DVD for the first time by Acorn Media UK on 5 March 2012.

Synopsis
North Square is a British drama about a group of young, irreverent barristers all hoping to make their mark in the legal profession at a defence chambers in Leeds, West Yorkshire. They are all under the leadership of their Machiavellian chief clerk Peter McLeish (Phil Davis), who is clever and obsessed by work and doesn't appear to have a social life. He's struggling to make this new enterprise work and will do anything to make it succeed and beat his archrival, Michael Marlowe (Tony Monroe), from whom he left, taking the best barristers with him. He establishes relationships with the top criminals in Leeds so he can get their best cases. He is not above persuading a client to offer a plea, not because it's in their best interests but because he doesn't want to miss out on a bigger case coming up.

Early in the series, Rose (Helen McCrory) and Billy (Kevin McKidd) give birth to a baby boy and Rose comes back to work four days later. Billy is on an assault charge for defending Wendy De Souza (Kim Vithana), their head of chambers, whom another barrister, Leo Wilson (who works for Marlowe's chambers), claimed only got to her position because of her skin colour and is suspended but then cleared. However, Marlowe continues to ask Billy to come back to his chambers which he refuses to do and he instructs the case to go to trial. Morag Black (Ruth Millar) is a new pupil at chambers, taken under the wing of Rose, and is used as a scapegoat to represent cases for Peter while he gives more high-profile cases to other barristers. Johnny Boy (James Murray) begins a relationship with Morag, however, Peter is against the relationship and instructs them both to end it. Later on, Hussein Ali (Robert Mountford), another pupil, also joins chambers under the guidance of Tom Mitford (Dominic Rowan), yet there is only one new place in chambers available. Peter supports Hussein as he believes he will bring in business because he's a British Asian. At the end of the series the decision of who should stay in chambers goes to Hussein, however Peter tells Morag that she can "squat" in their chambers.

Alex Hay (Rupert Penry-Jones), the golden boy of Peter McLeish, is a smooth, good-looking barrister with a city centre apartment and a relationship with Dr. Helen Ferryhough (Victoria Smurfit). But Peter is working with solicitor Stevie Goode (Sasha Behar), who can bring business to chambers away from Marlowe, and believes Helen is not strong enough for Alex so pushes Stevie and Alex together for the good of chambers. They embark on an affair, unaware that Peter is pulling the strings; using their relationship to secure big clients from Stevie. After a tip-off from Peter to Helen, she and Alex split up and Helen embarks on a relationship with Tom Mitford. At the end of the series, Alex begs Helen to come back to him and it is unknown whether Helen leaves Tom for Alex. John is the nephew of Peter McLeish and starts work as a trainee at chambers but due to the confusion of his name with his colleague, Johnny Boy, Peter tells him that he is now known as Bob to the rest of chambers. No one except Johnny Boy knows of their kinship, Peter admitting he has been installed "as his eyes and ears" of chambers.

Throughout the series there is an underlying story of Wendy De Souza, who happens to be having an affair with Judge Martin Bould, applying to be QC. She does not succeed in getting the position. Marlowe finds out about the affair and asks Billy to confirm it, stating that if he does the trial will be dropped. Billy confirms this to Marlowe which results in the trial being dropped but Peter is suspicious as to why. He eventually learns from Billy about his admission and advises Judge Martin to end his affair with Wendy De Souza. Billy tells Rose about what he has done and she is in despair about how Peter is controlling everybody's personal lives, how Wendy was betrayed and why Billy would go to Peter and not her. Plus, she is against Peter's dealings with criminals to secure work. At the same time, Alex learns from Helen that it was Peter who told her about his affair with Stevie. At this point, Rose lobbies the team to have Peter removed but in the end she gets no support and decides to leave chambers. However, Peter asks her to do one more case; represent his son, whom he has had no dealings with for 18 years, on a drugs charge. She manages to secure a "Not Guilty" verdict. At the end of the last episode, Rose walks back into chambers as the rest of the team are celebrating their one-year anniversary as a chambers.

Cast

 Phil Davis - Peter McLeish
 Helen McCrory - Rose Fitzgerald 
 Kevin McKidd - Billy Guthrie
 Rupert Penry-Jones - Alex Hay 
 Kim Vithana - Wendy De Souza
 Sasha Behar – Stevie Goode 
 Ruth Millar – Morag Black

 Dominic Rowan – Tom Mitford 
 James Murray – Johnny Boy
 James Midgeley – John "Bob" Mayfield
 Victoria Smurfit – Dr. Helen Ferryhough
 Robert Mountford – Hussein Ali 
 Tony Monroe – Michael Marlowe 
 Murray Head – Judge Martin Bould
 Jack Fortune – Leo Wilson

Episode list

Awards
BAFTA Television Awards 2001 –  Best Editing (Fiction/Entertainment) – Jon Costelloe
Broadcasting Press Guild Awards 2001
 Best Drama Series/Serial
 Best Actor Phil Davis
 Best Actress Helen McCrory
 Writer's Award Peter Moffat (shared with Simon Schama for A History of Britain)

Davis was also nominated for Best Actor at the 2001 Royal Television Society Awards.

References

External links
 
 Interview with Phil Davies at channel4.com

2000 British television series debuts
2000 British television series endings
2000s British drama television series
2000s British legal television series
Channel 4 original programming
English-language television shows
Television shows set in Leeds